Winford is a village in Somerset, England.

Winford may also refer to:

Winford, Isle of Wight
Winford baronets

People with the surname
Jim Winford (1909–1970), American baseball player